George Anderson was an early prominent member of the Canadian national soccer team.

Born in Bathgate, Scotland in 1901, Anderson played full back for all of Canada's six international games of their 1924 tour of Australia when the Canadians finished with a win-lose-draw record of 2-3-1.  The tour began in Sydney on May 10 and ended in Newcastle on July 27 with Canada having played 26 games.  One game was played in New Zealand on the way home against Auckland. His club at this time was Ladysmith.

He played in the Canadian Championship final of 1926 for Canadian Collieries of Cumberland when that team were beaten by United Weston of Winnipeg in the first final for the F.A. Trophy.  He was also a member of the Westminster Royals Canadian championship teams of 1927–1928 and 1929–1930 that defeated Montreal C.N.R, and the 1935–1936 team that defeated United Weston.  In addition he was a member of the same Royals team that won all the B.C. competitions in the 1928–29 season, but were beaten in the B.C. qualifying competition for the Canadian championship by Vancouver St. Saviours.  The 1928–29 Westminster Royals team, which didn't win the Canadian championship, were inducted into the British Columbia Sports Hall of Fame in 1979.

George Anderson played on a number of B.C. all-star teams including for Upper Island and the Pacific Coast League all-stars against the English touring team in 1926 and B.C. Lower Mainland against the Welsh F.A. in 1929.

He was inducted into the Canadian Soccer Hall of Fame in 2015 as a pioneer.

References

External links
 / Canada Soccer Hall of Fame

Year of death missing
Soccer people from British Columbia
Canada men's international soccer players
Canadian soccer players
Canada Soccer Hall of Fame inductees
Association football defenders
People from Bathgate
Sportspeople from New Westminster
British emigrants to Canada
Westminster Royals (soccer) players
1901 births
Footballers from West Lothian